Mónica Farro (born 28 February 1976) is an Uruguayan model and actress of theatre and television. She started her career as a child commercial model and then worked as an erotic actress and fetish model for Playboy TV. She was chosen as Miss Uruguay for Playboy 2004 Miss Playboy.

Theatre 
Farro's launch to fame was in 2007 after being discovered by the Argentine theatre producer Gerardo Sofovich in the Uruguayan capital, Montevideo. He signed Farro to his theatre company for two years in which she performed in his comedy No somos santas and his musical comedy Le Referi Cornud. In 2008 she was cast by Sofovich to co-star in the magazine La Fiesta Está En El Lago alongside dancer Valeria Archimó and actress-dancer Adabel Guerrero, with all three writing. It was produced and directed by Sofovich, and also directed by René Bertrand.

In 2009 Farro was signed into Carmen Barbieri's theatre company and was the protagonist of two of her magazines, Fantástica in the 2009-10 theatrical season and Bravísima in the 2010–11 season, both as the First Vedette. Farro decided not to sign for another year in the company, because she wasn't pleased with some of her cast members, especially Uruguayan actress-dancer and fashion model, Andrea Ghidone and Greek-Argentine amateur glamour model and media-showbiz personality, Victoria Xipolitakis. Barbieri commented that she would have Farro back for the 2013-14 summer season at all costs.

After four years of doing classical revue musicals, Farro was called in 2011 to lead and debut as a supervedette and as her own producer in an alternative revue show mixed with musical comedy with Negro Álvarez, touring all of Argentina and parts of Uruguay.

On November 2, 2012, the actress made an appearance for the river border state of Argentina, Entre Ríos Province, in the Astros Theatre, where she and many other theatre artists presented Entre Ríos' summer theatrical season debut for 2012 and 2013 with three shows. She starred as the lead actress in one of these, the theatre comedy La noche de las pistolas frías.

In November, Farro led a mini theatre magazine show, Empetroladas alongside dancing partner Cristian Ponce in Cutral Có, Neuquén, Argentina.

On January 4, 2013, La noche de las pistolas frías debuted in El Gran Teatro Colón in Entre Ríos, with Farro alongside Emilio Disi, Martín "Campi" Campilongo, Claudia Ciardone, Florencia "Flopy" Tesouro, Manuel Navarrete, Cristina Alberó and Luly Drozdek.

Bailando 2008 and El Musical de tus Sueños
Farro participated in the fifth season of Bailando por un Sueño with professional dancer Nicolás Scillama; she reached the top eight.

Mónica had a special participation in El Musical de tus Sueños in 2009, dancing on double stripper poles alongside Valeria Archimó, opening for the special edition re-entry gala (which Guerrero entered).

Bailando 2011
Farro has participated in the seventh season of Bailando por un Sueño with professional dancer Christian Ponce.

Realities shows

Personal life 
Farro was married to Uruguayan footballer Enrique Ferraro, with whom she had a child named Diego Ferraro Farro in Uruguay.

See also
 List of Playboy models
 List of glamour models

References

Sources 
 
 
 
 

1976 births
Living people
People from Montevideo
Uruguayan expatriate actresses in Argentina
Expatriate models in Argentina
21st-century Uruguayan actresses
Uruguayan stage actresses
Uruguayan female models
Glamour models
Participants in Argentine reality television series
Uruguayan vedettes
Uruguayan musical theatre actresses
Uruguayan musical theatre female dancers
Uruguayan musical theatre producers
Uruguayan theatrical dancer-actresses
Bailando por un Sueño (Argentine TV series) participants